Chembur Karnatak High School (often abbreviated as CKHS), is an English medium school located in  Chembur in Mumbai, India. The school has a strength of 2990 students. Two medium of instruction are offered - English from Nursery to SSC, and Kannada from Std. VIII to Std. X. A Junior College of Commerce and Science is also part of the School. Astronomy and quiz are a school strong point.

SSC curriculum
 Subjects taught include English First Language, Marathi as a Second Language, Hindi, Kannada, History, Geography, Algebra, Geometry, and Science.
 11th and 12th (Science and Commerce), HSC Maharashtra Board.

Activities
The institution has an accredited centre of National Open School through which young and old with truncated school careers complete their Secondary/Senior Secondary education. The Sangha has opened a Health Care Centre at the campus to give medical attention to the staff, students and the members. There are plans to develop the Health care centre into a full-fledged clinic and dispensary.

Motto
The school motto is "Mentally alert, Physically strong and Morally sound ".

See also
 List of schools in Mumbai

Educational institutions established in 1966
Schools in Chembur
High schools and secondary schools in Mumbai
1966 establishments in Maharashtra